Justice Tuck may refer to:

 Annabelle Clinton Imber Tuck (born 1950), American former associate justice of the Arkansas Supreme Court
 William Hallam Tuck (1808–1884), American justice of the Maryland Court of Appeals
 William Henry Tuck (1831–1913), Canadian chief justice of New Brunswick

See also
Somerville Pinkney Tuck (judge) (1848–1923), American judge who served on the International Court of Appeals in Egypt